Lộc Ninh is a township and the capital of Lộc Ninh district, Bình Phước province in the Southeast region of Vietnam.

During the Vietnam War, the 1967 "First Battle of Loc Ninh" and the 1972 "Battle of Loc Ninh", took place in Bình Phước Province, near the Cambodian border at the northern end of Highway 13, north of the presently named Ho Chi Minh City (né Saigon). Lộc Ninh served as the seat of the Provisional Revolutionary Government of the Republic of South Vietnam from its formation in 1969 until the Fall of Saigon in 1975.

Transport
In 2007, a section of the proposed Trans-Asian Railway connecting Cambodia with Vietnam would pass through Lộc Ninh. The Vietnamese government completed a feasibility study on the Saigon–Lộc Ninh Railway, and is working with the Cambodian government to finalize the connecting rail point on the Cambodian side. Once the exact connecting point is found, work is expected to begin immediately on the 145-kilometer link between Lộc Ninh and Hồ Chí Minh City.

See also
 Transport in Vietnam

Maps

References

External links 
Provisional Revolutionary Government of South Vietnam (1969-1975)

Populated places in Bình Phước province
District capitals in Vietnam
Townships in Vietnam